This page documents the tornadoes and tornado outbreaks of 1998, primarily in the United States. Most tornadoes form in the U.S., although some events may take place internationally. Tornado statistics for older years like this often appear significantly lower than modern years due to fewer reports or confirmed tornadoes, however by the 1990s tornado statistics were coming closer to the numbers we see today.

Synopsis

The 1998 tornado season saw record numbers of tornadoes and also the most fatalities since 1974 (surpassed in 2011). A number of tornado events resulted in large loss of life. In February, a series of tornadoes caused 42 fatalities in Florida. In March, a tornado killed 12 in Georgia. In April an F5 tornado killed 32 in the Birmingham, Alabama area (no stranger to killer tornadoes). By year's end, 130 people had been killed in the United States.

Events

Confirmed tornado total for the entire year 1998 in the United States.

January
There were 47 tornadoes confirmed in the U.S. in January.

February
There were 72 tornadoes confirmed in the U.S. in February.

February 2–3

February 9–12

The Storm Prediction Center issued an extremely rare February high risk day for February 10. A rare derecho then affected parts of Texas, Louisiana and Mississippi, producing widespread damaging winds and 22 tornadoes.

February 15–17

February 22–23

The deadliest tornado event in Florida history struck in Late-February. 42 people were killed and 260 were injured. The previous record for the highest tornado death toll in Florida history was 17 on March 31, 1962.

March
There were 72 tornadoes confirmed in the U.S. in March.

March 7–9

A large storm system produced 26 tornadoes across the southeast. In addition, heavy snow was reported in Chicago and heavy rain caused flooding.

March 20

A deadly tornado outbreak struck portions of the Southeastern United States on March 20. Particularly hard hit was Gainesville, Georgia, where at least 12 people were killed in an early morning F3 tornado. The entire outbreak killed 14 people and produced 12 tornadoes across three states with the town of Stoneville, North Carolina also being hard hit by the storms.

March 28

An F2 tornado touched down at approximately 5:25 AM in the town of Mattoon, Illinois. Winds reached around 152 miles per hour and damaged over 90 homes damaged and eight homes and six businesses were destroyed. Tornado Warnings were in effect but had expired at 5:00 AM leaving no warning from tornado sirens or trained spotters in the field. Unusually, the tornado spawned at the back end of a storm instead of the front. At least three people were injured.

March 29

An unseasonably-strong tornado outbreak affected the Upper Midwest on March 29. 16 tornadoes struck across the region—14 in Minnesota and two in Wisconsin. 13 of the tornadoes in Minnesota were spawned by a single supercell thunderstorm. Two people were killed, and 21 others were injured. Most of the damage was caused by three tornadoes: an F4 tornado that hit the town of Comfrey, Minnesota, an F3 tornado that struck St. Peter, Minnesota, and an F2 tornado that hit Le Center, Minnesota.

April
There were 182 tornadoes confirmed in the U.S. in April.

April 6–9

An extremely violent F5 tornado started North of Kellerman, Alabama and traveled through  Northern Jefferson County, before dissipating in Northern Pratt City. The F5 tornado produced catastrophic damage in Oak Grove, McDonald Chapel, and the small community of Edgewater. The same supercell that spawned the Birmingham F5 spawned an F2 that continued into neighboring St. Clair County, killing two people. A high-end F2 tornado struck Dunwoody, Georgia, a northern suburb of metro Atlanta late on April 8, striking parts of DeKalb and Gwinnett Counties. It is one of the strongest and most damaging tornadoes ever recorded to have hit the area.

In all, 62 tornadoes touched down from the Midwestern United States and Texas to the Mid-Atlantic. The outbreak was responsible for at least 41 deaths, with seven in Georgia and 34 in Alabama.

April 15–16

A two-day tornado outbreak affected portions of the Midwestern United States, Mississippi and Tennessee Valleys on April 15–16, with the worst of the outbreak taking place on the second day. On that day, at least 10 tornadoes swept through Middle Tennessee—three of them touching down in Nashville, causing significant damage to the downtown and East Nashville areas. Nashville became the first major city in nearly 20 years to have an F2+ tornado make a direct hit in the downtown area.

In addition, the outbreak produced several other destructive tornadoes in Middle Tennessee. One of them, southwest of Nashville, was an F5 tornado—one of only two ever recorded in the state. That tornado remained mainly in rural areas of Wayne and Lawrence Counties. Other tornadoes during the 2-day outbreak struck Arkansas, Alabama, Illinois and Kentucky.

12 people were killed by tornadoes during the outbreak, including two in Arkansas, three in Kentucky, and seven in Tennessee.

May
There were 310 tornadoes confirmed in the U.S. in May.

May 4
Two rare, anticyclonic tornadoes struck Los Altos and Sunnyvale in Santa Clara County, California (Silicon Valley).

May 7 
A tornado outbreak in the Southeast spawned 20 tornadoes in North Carolina, including an F3 tornado in Clemmons and an F4 tornado in Caldwell County.

May 15

A large squall line with embedded supercells crossed much of Minnesota, producing large hail, destructive downburst winds, and five weak, but damaging F1 tornadoes, which killed one and injured 31. In all, the storms caused $1.5 billion (1998 USD) in damage.

Another separate storms in Iowa spawned several tornadoes including Lone Tree dusty F3 tornado which causes significant damage and injuring 19 peoples. 17 in Johnson County and 2 in Downey, Iowa.

May 30–31

A historic tornado outbreak and derecho began on the afternoon of May 30 and lasted into the next day. It affected a large portion of the northern half of the United States and Southern Ontario from Southeastern Montana east-southeastward to the Atlantic Ocean. The initial tornado outbreak, including the devastating Spencer tornado, hit Southeast South Dakota on the evening of May 30. The Spencer tornado was the most destructive and second deadliest tornado in South Dakota history. 13 people were killed; seven by tornadoes and six by the derecho, and damage was estimated to be at least $500 million. Over two million people lost electrical power, some for up to 10 days.

June
There were 376 tornadoes confirmed in the U.S. in June.

June 2

The most significant tornado outbreak in recent history over the east-central United States occurred on June 2. This severe weather event spawned a total of 50 tornadoes from New York to South Carolina and caused an estimated $42 million in damage, 80 injuries and two fatalities. For portions of New York, New Jersey and Pennsylvania, it was the second historic severe weather outbreak in three days, as it immediately followed the Late-May 1998 tornado outbreak and derecho on May 30–31, which spawned 41 tornadoes over New York, New Jersey, Pennsylvania and Vermont, caused an estimated $83 million in damage, 109 injuries and one fatality.

June 13

June 13 saw over 40 tornadoes touchdown in the United States, primarily across Kansas, Nebraska, and Oklahoma. Significant tornadoes include an F2 which struck Downtown Sabetha, Kansas, and four tornadoes which struck the North Oklahoma City area.

June 23
A very large F2 tornado occurred in the open countryside near Columbus, Nebraska, slowly churning through fields and destroying a few farmsteads. One house was blown off its foundation.

June 29

Along with a long-lived derecho that affected areas from South Dakota to Iowa, 20 tornadoes were reported, one of which was an F2 tornado, injuring 85 people in central Iowa.  Over eight states, the derecho and associated tornadoes killed one person and injured 174.

July
There were 82 tornadoes confirmed in the U.S. in July.

August
There were 61 tornadoes confirmed in the U.S. in August.
On August 23, a tornado hit Egg Harbor, causing an estimated $6.5 million in damages.

September
There were 104 tornadoes confirmed in the U.S. in September.

September 24–30

Hurricane Georges triggered a six-day tornado outbreak as it moved through Southeastern United States. Most of the tornadoes produced by the storm formed in the outer bands of the storm and were relatively weak; however, one F2 tornado touched down in Florida. The outbreak produced 47 tornadoes—20 in Alabama, 17 in Florida and 10 in Georgia—and was the most extensive tornado event in Florida history, with touchdowns reported throughout the entire length of the state.

October
There were 86 tornadoes confirmed in the U.S. in October.

October 4

October 4 saw 29 tornadoes touch down in the United States, 26 of which struck Oklahoma. The day was Oklahoma's largest October tornado outbreak on record. Thunderstorms initially developed over Northwestern Oklahoma during the mid-to-late afternoon hours. The first tornado, rated F2, touched down in Southeastern Woods County to the south-southwest of the town of Dacoma. The tornado then tracked northeast, causing damage to an abandoned house and destroying a barn and garage. Entering Alfalfa County, the tornado then destroyed an office building and a gas plant and blew the roof off a nearby modular home. Multiple witnesses reported this multiple-vortex tornado to have been at least a quarter of a mile wide. The second tornado, rated F0, touched down southeast of Cherokee in Alfalfa County where it was spotted by a county sheriff's deputy. An F0 tornado was spotted by a state tropper and was on the ground for less than one minute near SH-11 west of Medford and caused no known damage.

November
There were 26 tornadoes confirmed in the U.S. in November.

December
There were 6 tornadoes confirmed in the U.S. in December.

December 15 (South Africa)
An F2 tornado hit Umtata, Eastern Cape, South Africa. Roofs and walls were torn from some structures. Eleven people died when the wall of a bus station collapsed.

See also
 Tornado
 Tornadoes by year
 Tornado records
 Tornado climatology
 Tornado myths
 List of tornado outbreaks
 List of F5 and EF5 tornadoes
 List of North American tornadoes and tornado outbreaks
 List of 21st-century Canadian tornadoes and tornado outbreaks
 List of European tornadoes and tornado outbreaks
 List of tornadoes and tornado outbreaks in Asia
 List of Southern Hemisphere tornadoes and tornado outbreaks
 List of tornadoes striking downtown areas
 Tornado intensity
 Fujita scale
 Enhanced Fujita scale

References

External links 
 U.S. tornadoes in 1998 - Tornado History Project
 Storm Data "1998 Annual Summaries" (NCDC)
 U.S. Killer Tornadoes of 1998 (The Tornado Project)
 Tornado deaths monthly (University of Nebraska, Lincoln)

 
1998 meteorology
Tornado-related lists by year
Torn